Caló is a Portuguese and Spanish surname. Notable people with the surname include:

Surname
 Francisco Caló, Portuguese footballer
 Miguel Caló, Argentinian tango bandoneonist

Nickname
 Caló (footballer), Cape Verdean footballer

See also

Caloy
Carlo (name)

Spanish-language surnames
Portuguese-language surnames